Kristina Aleksanyan (born 25 March 1989) is an Armenian professional footballer who plays as a midfielder. She currently plays for Armenia women's national football team.

See also
List of Armenia women's international footballers

References

External links
 ffa.am

1989 births
Living people
Women's association football midfielders
Armenian women's footballers
Armenia women's international footballers
Zvezda 2005 Perm players
WFC Rossiyanka players
Ryazan-VDV players
Armenian expatriate footballers
Armenian expatriate sportspeople in Russia
Expatriate women's footballers in Russia
Armenian expatriate sportspeople in Ukraine
Expatriate women's footballers in Ukraine
WFC Zhytlobud-1 Kharkiv players